Fritillaria graeca is a European plant species in the lily family Liliaceae. It is native to the Balkans (Albania, Bulgaria, North Macedonia, and Greece). Some older literature says that the plant can also be found in Serbia, but all these collections are of var. gussichiae, now regarded as a distinct species called Fritillaria gussichiae.

Fritillaria graeca has flowers with red and white stripes which resemble small bells - one on each stem. It blooms between April and May. It reaches a height of around 25 cm.

Subspecies
Fritillaria graeca subsp. graeca - eastern + southern Greece including Crete
Fritillaria graeca subsp. thessala (Boiss.) Rix - Albania, Bulgaria, North Macedonia, northern Greece

formerly included
Fritillaria graeca var. gussichiae, now called Fritillaria gussichiae 
Fritillaria graeca var. skorpili, now called  Fritillaria skorpili

References

graeca
Flora of Europe
Plants described in 1846
Taxa named by Pierre Edmond Boissier